Muscarella cabellensis is a species of orchid plant native to Mexico.

References 

Pleurothallidinae
Flora of Mexico